We Are Not Alone or We're Not Alone may refer to:

Music

Albums 
We Are Not Alone (Breaking Benjamin album), 2004
We Are Not Alone (StorySide:B album), 2007

Songs 
"We Are Not Alone", by Frank Zappa from The Man from Utopia
"We Are Not Alone", by Karla DeVito from  The Breakfast Club (Original Motion Picture Soundtrack)
"We Are Not Alone", by Raffi from Evergreen Everblue
"We're Not Alone", by Dinosaur Jr. from Beyond
"We're Not Alone", by Echosmith from Talking Dreams
"We're Not Alone", by Nas from Untitled Nas album

Media 
We Are Not Alone (novel), a 1937 novel by James Hilton
We Are Not Alone (1939 film), based on Hilton's novel, starring Paul Muni
We Are Not Alone (1993 film), a Japanese film directed by Yōjirō Takita
"We Are Not Alone", an episode of 2004 TV series Powers
We Are Not Alone (2022 film), a British made-for-television sci-fi comedy film

Other uses 
We Are Not Alone, a 1964 book by Walter S. Sullivan
We Are Not Alone, a support organization for former psychiatric patients

See also 
Not Alone (disambiguation)
You're Not Alone (disambiguation)